Primal is an action-adventure horror video game developed by SCE Cambridge Studio  and published by Sony Computer Entertainment for PlayStation 2. It tells the story of Jennifer Tate, a 21-year-old woman searching for her boyfriend through a series of demonic realms. As the story develops, more is revealed about Jen's past and her relationship with her boyfriend, as well as the nature of the demon worlds.

Gameplay
In Primal, the player can control either Jen or Scree as they navigate the realms of Oblivion. As the game progresses, newer demonic forms are obtained, which prove invaluable in solving various puzzles and combat.

Control can be switched between Jen and Scree at any time in game. When in control of one, the other will be operated by an artificial intelligence (AI), performing various functions depending on the situation. During play, the characters can interact with one another, performing actions such as asking questions, or siphoning energy.

When in control of Jen, the player may transform into one of four demonic forms for various purposes, depending on the situation (provided the forms are unlocked). When in a demon form, Jen experiences a boost in attack, defense, speed, attack range and access to abilities unavailable in a human form. The tattoo on Jen's back also glows when in a demon form, corresponding to various forms.

Defeating enemies involves weakening enemies to the point where their hit points reach zero, at which time a finishing move must be performed to kill the enemy. While the moves differ in style and time taken, the final effect remains the same. Enemies can be finished off before the health bar reaches zero, and doing so leaves more residual energy.

While Jen can remain in a demonic form indefinitely, taking damage will reduce health. However, hit points here are represented by demonic energy. When an enemy is killed, the remaining energy can be drained through use of Scree, who can store the energy for when it is needed. Jen can then call on the energy, siphoning it off to replenish her own. Scree can store a vast amount of energy, but also has limits as to how much.

When in control of Scree, the player is invulnerable; Scree, being a gargoyle, cannot suffer damage, making him an effective scout. Scree is capable of climbing on stone walls, a necessary ability when traversing the realms. Scree can also store drained energy from dead enemies, which can be used to replenish Jen's demonic health, though he must remain immobile when doing so.

Scree is revealed to be the long-lost Abdizur, who disappeared following an encounter with the lord of Chaos. In Solus, for a temporary amount of time, the player possesses a life-size statue of Abdizur via Scree, to combat Belhazur when Jen's powers are not fit to do so. The player may also possess other statues in an area under given circumstances.

The player may also happen across various energy crystals, which can be stored and used if Scree's energy reserves are not enough and the player is at low health. These crystals are kept throughout the game, the only exclusion being when revisiting previous scenes, at which point they are reduced to a default amount. This means that the crystals function as extra lives, to a degree.

If Jen is in human form, her health replenishes automatically if she is not in battle (human form only; demon energy must be replenished by either drawing on Scree's reserve energy or, failing that, by using a crystal). While in human form, Jen's health represents her presence in the demon world. If she loses all her health while in human form, she is returned to the human world, where she is in a near-death state. When this happens, the player must direct Scree to the nearest rift gate within a time limit (not seen on screen, though the voice of Arella warns the player that time is running out). If Scree does not reach a rift gate in time, Jen dies, and the game is over.

Throughout the game, constant saving can prove onerous, particularly if the player wishes to backtrack and revisit certain areas. Provided a save game is present, the player may do so, and can revisit nearly all of the locations, once they have been unlocked via an in-game cutscene.

Development
In May 2016, the game was made available for the PlayStation 4 through the PlayStation Network with slightly improved graphics and trophy support.

Music
Primal features music by electronic rock band 16Volt. Some of the tracks presented in the game are:
 Suffering You (fight music) -Written by Eric Powell, John Desalvo and Mike Peoples
 Alkali (fight music) -Written by Eric Powell, John Desalvo and Mike Peoples
 Happy Pill (fight music) -Written by Eric Powell and Mike Peoples
 Blessed (fight music)
 At The End (during credits)
 Moutheater (menu screen) -Written by Eric Powell and Mike Peoples
 And I Go (fight music)
 Everyday Everything (fight music) -Written by Eric Powell and Mike Peoples
 Keep Sleeping (fight music)
 Plastic Blue -Written by Eric Powell
 At The End -Written by Eric Powell and Krayge Tyler

The combat tracks from Primal feature on the album SuperCoolNothing V2.0 from 16 Volt, and the band had a cameo appearance in Primal, where they played in a club in the opening cut scene. The "cinematic tracks" were composed by Andrew Barnabas and performed by the City of Prague Philharmonic Orchestra and Chorus. A suite dedicated to its music was performed at the historic Symphonic Game Music Concert in Leipzig 2003.

Reception

Primal received "mixed or average" reviews, according to review aggregator Metacritic. IGN said that the game was "Limited by an inconsequential combat system and basic wander-puzzles. What it does manage to do though is overwhelm us with high-quality production values, wow us with an excellent graphical presentation, and move us with one hell of a killer soundtrack." In the article "Overrated/Underrated" in their September 2004 issue, Official U.S. PlayStation Magazine cited the game's protagonist as an underrated "hot chick" in comparison to Lara Croft, stating "She's smart. She's funny. She hangs out in biker bars. She's good in a fight. And she's got a really nice butt." In the same article, Scree was likewise cited as an underrated sidekick, stating "This is the way to make a memorable sidekick: Make him dignified, make him funny looking, and make him useful." Eurogamer, on the other hand, stated: "A rank combat system, quirky camera and a lack of inspiration at the game's exploration/puzzle core make playing the game hard work."

Legacy
A large amount of development artwork from the game is held in the archive of The Centre for Computing History, and is in the process of being made available to view online as part of their video game preservation initiative.

References

External links
 

2003 video games
Action-adventure games
Fantasy video games
PlayStation 2 games
PlayStation 2-only games
Single-player video games
Sony Interactive Entertainment games
Video games about demons
Video games about genies
Video games adapted into comics
Video games developed in the United Kingdom
Video games featuring female protagonists